Half Thang is the second album by American rapper Richie Rich.

Track listing
"Intro" 0:32
"Ruff Neckin'" 5:06
"Half Thang" 3:55
"Busta Phree" 4:29
"As Usual (Skit)" 0:45
"80 Ounces" 3:05
"Fuck Dat Nigga (Skit)" 0:54
"Tastes Like Shit" 4:37
"Cheap Thrill" 4:32
"W. Dick (Skit)" (featuring Kev T.) 0:34
"Dirde Luv" 4:38
"Young Guns" (featuring T-Uni & Eclipz) 5:13
"Triple Gold (Outro)" 1:01

Samples
"Ruff Neckin'"
"Nuthin' but a "G" Thang" By Dr. Dre
"Half Thang"
"Ain't No Future in Yo' Frontin" by MC Breed
"Let Me Ride" by Dr. Dre
"Cheap Thrill"
"Seven Minutes of Funk" by Tyrone Thomas & The Whole Darn Family
"Pop Life" by Prince
"Triple Gold" (Skit)
"Waterfalls" By TLC

Chart history

References

External links
 [ Half Thang] at Allmusic
 Half Thang at Discogs
 Half Thang at MusicBrainz

Richie Rich (rapper) albums
1996 albums
Gangsta rap albums by American artists